Fugløya may refer to:

Places
Fugløya, Austevoll, an island in Austevoll municipality in Hordaland county, Norway
Fugløya, Flatanger, an island in Flatanger municipality in Trøndelag county, Norway
Fugløya, Gildeskål, an island in Gildeskål municipality in Nordland county, Norway
Fugløya, Iveland, an island in Iveland municipality in Aust-Agder county, Norway
Fugløya, Kristiansund, an island in Kristiansund municipality in Møre og Romsdal county, Norway
Fugløya, Larvik, an island in Larvik municipality in Vestfold county, Norway
Fugløya, Lødingen, an island in Lødingen municipality in Nordland county, Norway
Fugløya, Smøla, an island in Smøla municipality in Møre og Romsdal county, Norway
Fugløya, Snillfjord, an island in Snillfjord municipality in Trøndelag county, Norway
Fugløya, Svalbard, an island in Svalbard, Norway
Fugløya, Tvedestrand, an island in Tvedestrand municipality in Aust-Agder county, Norway

See also
Nord-Fugløya, an island in Karløy municipality in Troms county, Norway